Hajnal is both a Hungarian surname and a female given name. It means 'dawn' in Hungarian, the first light of daybreak. Diminutive Hajnalka is also used as a female given name; it is also the Hungarian word for morning glory. Notable people with Hajnal either as a surname or given name:

Surname:
András Hajnal (1931–2016), Hungarian mathematician
János Hajnal (1913–2010), Hungarian-born artist and illustrator based in Italy
John Hajnal (1926–2008), Hungarian-British mathematician and professor of statistics
Tamás Hajnal (born 1981), Hungarian footballer

Given name:
Hajnal Andréka (born 1947), Hungarian mathematician
Hajnal Ban (born 1977), Australian lawyer and politician

Hungarian feminine given names
Hungarian-language surnames